Tungsten hexachloride is the chemical compound of tungsten and chlorine with the formula WCl6.  This dark violet blue species exists as a volatile solid under standard conditions. It is an important starting reagent in the preparation of tungsten compounds.  Other examples of charge-neutral hexachlorides are rhenium(VI) chloride and molybdenum(VI) chloride. The highly volatile tungsten hexafluoride is also known.

As a d0 ion, W(VI) forms diamagnetic derivatives.  The hexachloride is octahedral with equivalent W–Cl distances of 2.24–2.26 Å.

Preparation
Tungsten hexachloride can be prepared by chlorinating tungsten metal in a sealed tube at 600 °C:
 W + 3 Cl2 → WCl6

Properties and Reactions
Tungsten (VI) chloride is a blue-black solid at room temperature. At lower temperatures, it becomes wine-red in color. A red form of the compound can be made by rapidly condensing its vapor, which reverts to the blue-black form on gentle heating. It is readily hydrolyzed, even by moist air, giving the orange oxychlorides WOCl4 and WO2Cl2, and subsequently, tungsten trioxide. WCl6 is soluble in carbon disulfide, carbon tetrachloride, and phosphorus oxychloride.

Methylation with trimethylaluminium affords hexamethyl tungsten:
 WCl6 +3 Al2(CH3)6 → W(CH3)6 + 3 Al2(CH3)4Cl2

Treatment with butyl lithium affords a reagent that is useful for deoxygenation of epoxides.

The chloride ligands in WCl6 can be replaced by many anionic ligands including: bromide, thiocyanate and alkoxide (R = alkyl, aryl).

Reduction of WCl6 gives, sequentially, tungsten(V) chloride and tungsten(IV) chloride.

Safety considerations
WCl6 is an aggressively corrosive oxidant, and hydrolyzes to release hydrogen chloride.

References

Tungsten halides
Chlorides
Octahedral compounds